Purse Caundle is a village and civil parish in the county of Dorset in southwest England. In 2013 the estimated population of the parish was 90.

Purse Caundle manor house was built in the 15th century under the instruction of Richard Long, who bought 575 acres of land here in 1428. The manor's site was recorded as early as the Domesday Book in 1086, when it was a tenancy of Athelney Abbey.

The village church provides the final resting place for the seventeenth-century physician Nathaniel Highmore, whose father was rector here.

References

External links 

Villages in Dorset